Willie Louis Scott (February 13, 1959 – February 8, 2021) was an American professional football player who was a tight end in the National Football League (NFL).  Scott was the son of Gloria and Willie Scott.  Gloria and Willie were employed at Newberry High School.  Gloria was a math teacher and Willie was an assistant principal.  Scott attended Newberry High School in Newberry, South Carolina. Scott graduated from the University of South Carolina in 1981 and was drafted and went on to play with the Kansas City Chiefs from 1981 to 1985 and also the New England Patriots from 1986 to 1988.

He was a leader of the NAACP for his region. He was also a football coach at Brookland-Cayce High School. He died February 8, 2021, five days short of his 62nd birthday.

References

1959 births
2021 deaths
People from Newberry, South Carolina
Coaches of American football from South Carolina
Players of American football from South Carolina
American football tight ends
South Carolina Gamecocks football players
Kansas City Chiefs players
New England Patriots players